Nello Altomare is a Canadian politician, who was elected to the Legislative Assembly of Manitoba in the 2019 Manitoba general election. He represents the electoral district of Transcona as a member of the New Democratic Party of Manitoba.

Prior to his election to the legislature, Altomare was a teacher and school administrator in Winnipeg.

Electoral results

References

New Democratic Party of Manitoba MLAs
Politicians from Winnipeg
 Politicians
Living people
21st-century Canadian politicians
Canadian politicians of Italian descent
Year of birth missing (living people)